Low copy repeats (LCRs), also known as segmental duplications (SDs), are DNA sequences present in multiple locations within a genome that share high levels of sequence identity.

Repeats
The repeats, or duplications, are typically 10–300 kb in length, and bear greater than 95% sequence identity. Though rare in most mammals, LCRs comprise a large portion of the human genome owing to a significant expansion during primate evolution. In humans, chromosomes Y and 22 have the greatest proportion of SDs: 50.4% and 11.9% respectively.

Misalignment of LCRs during non-allelic homologous recombination (NAHR) is an important mechanism underlying the chromosomal microdeletion disorders as well as their reciprocal duplication partners. Many LCRs are concentrated in "hotspots", such as the 17p11-12 region, 27% of which is composed of LCR sequence. NAHR and non-homologous end joining (NHEJ) within this region are responsible for a wide range of disorders, including Charcot–Marie–Tooth syndrome type 1A, hereditary neuropathy with liability to pressure palsies, Smith–Magenis syndrome, and Potocki–Lupski syndrome.

Detection 
The two widely accepted methods for SD detection are:
1. Whole-genome assembly comparison (WGAC), and 
2. Whole-genome shotgun sequence detection (WSSD).

See also
 Pseudogenes
 Molecular evolution
 Comparative genomics
 Inparanoid
 Tandem exon duplication
 1q21.1 copy number variations
 Segmental duplication on the human Y chromosome

References

Molecular genetics
Mutation